Ésih (romanized as Esih in Indonesian Spelling System) is a female Sundanese given name, meaning affectionate. Other forms of this name are Écih and Icih.

Esih as first name was found 5 times in 3 different countries.

Possible meanings 
The meaning of the name Esih are "loving", "love philter" or "affectionate" in Sundanese.

Notable people with this name 

 Ade Uu Sukaesih, a mayor of Banjar, West Java, Indonesia for the period 2013–2018.

Fictional character 

 Sukaesih/Esih, one of the characters in the soap opera Preman Pensiun

See also

References 

Given names
Sundanese feminine given names